Ebenezer Run is a  long 1st order tributary to Cross Creek in Brooke County, West Virginia.  This is the only stream of this name in the United States.

Variant names
According to the Geographic Names Information System, it has also been known historically as:
Ebenexer Run

Course
Ebenezer Run rises in a pond at Mechling Hill, in Brooke County, West Virginia and then flows south-southwest to join Cross Creek at Louise, West Virginia.

Watershed
Ebenezer Run drains  of area, receives about 40.1 in/year of precipitation, has a wetness index of 303.71, and is about 78% forested.

See also
List of Rivers of West Virginia

References

Rivers of West Virginia
Rivers of Brooke County, West Virginia